Yau Oi may refer to:
 Yau Oi Estate, a public housing estate in Tuen Mun, Hong Kong
 Yau Oi stop, an MTR Light Rail stop adjacent to the estate